Danio assamila  is a species of Danio found in the Brahmaputra River drainage in India.

References

Danio
Fish described in 2015